Dead Mans Shoes is the debut album by Norwegian rockabilly band The Lucky Bullets.

The album was recorded during Winter/Spring 2012 in Norway, and is produced by Peter Lundell. It consists mainly of western, blues, some rockabilly, some sad tunes, some cabaret, some gunfighter songs. It is currently scheduled for a June 1, 2012 nationwide release, with limited release the day before.

Several of the tracks, including "Name Tattoo" and "Ghost Riders in the Sky", has been part of the band's live catalogue for years.

Track listing 
 Dead Man´s Shoes
 Devil Behind
 Name Tattoo
 Mrs. B. Have
 Big Hit
 Mexico Joe
 The Bosses Daughter
 Tipsy Lou
 Fire Below
 Heavy Load
 Ghost Riders In The Sky (Stan Jones)
 The Barrel Of Her Gun

All tracks written by the Lucky Bullets unless stated otherwise.

References 

2012 debut albums